The 1890–91 season was the first season in which Ardwick A.F.C. competed in a national competitive football competition, having spent the first years of their existence playing friendly matches against local clubs, as well as recent participation in the Manchester Cup. The club entered the FA Cup in October 1890, comprehensively winning their first game, but were scratched from the tournament before their next game. Their 12–0 win over Liverpool Stanley remains their record biggest win in a competitive fixture.

Team Kit

FA Cup

Squad statistics

Squad
Appearances for competitive matches only

Scorers

FA cup

See also
Manchester City F.C. seasons

References

External links
Extensive Manchester City statistics site

1890-91
English football clubs 1890–91 season